This is a list of individuals who have served as Minister of the Economy and Finance (Ministres de l'Économie et des Finances) of Ivory Coast.

Ministers
Raphaël Saller, April 1959 - January 1966
Henri Konan Bedie, January 1966 - July 1977
Abdoulaye Koné, July 1977 - September 1989
Moise Koumoue Koffi, October 1989 - November 1990
Alassane Ouattara, October 1990 - November 1993
Daniel Kablan Duncan, (minister-delegate) November 1990 - December 1993
Niamien N'Goran, December 1993 - December 1999
N'golo Coulibaly, January 2000 – May 2000
Mamadou Koulibaly, May 2000 - January 2001
Paul Antoine Bohoun Bouabre, January 2001 – December 2005
Charles Konan Banny, December 2005 – April 2007
Charles Koffi Diby, April 2007 – November 2012
Kaba Nialé, November 2012 - January 2016
Adama Koné, January 2016 - September 2019
Adama Coulibaly, September 2019 - 

Source:

References

See also 
 Economy of Ivory Coast

Government ministers of Ivory Coast

Ivory Coast